Baranga may refer to:

Baranga (river), in Romania
Aurel Baranga, Romanian playwright

See also
 Barang (disambiguation)
 Baranca (disambiguation)